Sinuatophloeus is a genus of beetles in the family Laemophloeidae, containing the following species:

 Sinuatophloeus juvencus Kessel, 1921
 Sinuatophloeus nigricans Kessel, 1921

References

Cucujoidea genera
Laemophloeidae